The Lengenbach Quarry is located in the Binn Valley (Valais, Switzerland) and it is noted among the mineralogical community for its unusual sulfosalt mineral specimens. 

The dolomite hosted deposit of the quarry is in the Binn Valley, a small valley in the southwest of Switzerland in the Swiss canton of Valais. To its south lies Italy.

Mineralogy
The mineralogy has been studied for nearly 200 years. Lengenbach is the type locality for 48 minerals.

References

Bibliography on the mineralogy and geology of Lengenbach quarry
 Binntal minerals information

Sulfosalt minerals
Economy of Switzerland
Mining in Switzerland
Surface mines in Switzerland 
Geography of Valais
Quarries